Stevie is the second album released by Madlib's virtual band, Yesterdays New Quintet. As suggested by the title, the album is a tribute album to the R&B musician, Stevie Wonder. It was released in 2004 on Stones Throw Records.

Track listing
All tracks produced by Madlib.
All tracks composed by Yesterdays New Quintet.

 "Prelude" – 0:29
 "Superstition" – 3:06
 "Visions" – 3:44
 "Superwoman/Where Were You Last Winter" – 5:10
 "Rocket Love Pt. 1" – 3:07
 "You've Got It Bad Girl" – 3:43
 "Send One Your Love" – 2:51
 "Too High" – 2:36
 "I Am Singing" – 4:47
 "Golden Lady" – 3:46
 "That Girl" – 4:26

Personnel
Credits adopted from Discogs.
 Bass guitar – Monk Hughes
 Drums – Otis Jackson Jr.
 Keyboards – Joe McDuphrey
 Percussion – Malik Flavors
 Vibraphone – Ahmad Miller
 Written by – Stevie Wonder

References

2004 albums
Madlib albums
Stones Throw Records albums